Santa is a given name.  As a Latvian feminine given name, the name day of persons named Santa is September 14.

Notable people with the given name Santa 

Santa Blumberga (born 1994), Latvian curler and curling coach
Santa Dimopulos (born 1987), Ukrainian singer, former member of the Ukrainian musical group Nu Virgos
Santa Dreimane (born 1985), Latvian basketball player
Santa Montefiore (born 1970), English writer
 Santa Ratniece (born 1977), Latvian composer
Santa Reyes, Dominican singer-songwriter known professionally as Santaye
Santa J. Ono (born 1962), a Canadian-American biologist and university administrator.

References

Latvian feminine given names